Familiar Grounds is a 2011 Canadian drama film directed by Stéphane Lafleur.

Cast
 Francis La Haye as Benoit
 Fanny Mallette as Maryse
 Michel Daigle as André
 Sylvain Marcel as Alain
 Denis Houle as L'Homme du futur
 Suzanne Lemoine as Nathalie

Awards
The film was the winner of the inaugural Prix collégial du cinéma québécois in 2012.

Sylvain Bellemare, Pierre Bertrand and Bernard Gariépy Strobl received a Jutra Award nomination for Best Sound at the 14th Jutra Awards in 2012.

References

External links
 

2011 films
Canadian drama films
2011 drama films
Films directed by Stéphane Lafleur
French-language Canadian films
2010s Canadian films